William Reader may refer to:
 William Reader (politician), member of the Wisconsin State Assembly
 William Reader (priest), Irish priest
 W. J. Reader (William Joseph Reader), English historian
 Ralph Reader (William Henry Ralph Reader), British actor, theatrical producer and songwriter